The Federal Institute of São Paulo (Portuguese: Instituto Federal de São Paulo, IFSP), or in full: Federal Institute of Education, Science and Technology of São Paulo (Portuguese: Instituto Federal de Educação, Ciência e Tecnologia de São Paulo) is an institution that offers high education and professional education by having a pluricurricular form. It is a multicampi institution, specializing in offering professional and technological education in different areas of knowledge (biologics/human sciences/exact sciences). It was known previously as Federal Center of Technological Education of São Paulo (Portuguese: Centro Federal de Educação Tecnológica de São Paulo, CEFET-SP). IFSP is one of the five Federal Colleges in São Paulo, the other ones being ITA, UFSCar, UNIFESP and UFABC.

History 

The IFSP is a public and federal institution directly vinculated to the Ministry of Education of Brazil (MEC). Its follows the tradition of public schools being the strongest in Brazil, and as well, São Paulo. The history of IFSP is marked, on its different phases, by the great quality of public education, professional formation offered to the international and the Brazilian market.

The history begins with the creation of the Escola de Aprendizes e Artífices (EAA) (School of Apprentices and Artifices), created in 1909, had its education focused on the formation of workmen and foremen.

The EAA evolved, between 1960 and 1990, into Escola Técnica Federal de São Paulo (ETEFSP) (São Paulo Technical School); forming medium level technicians, initially to the areas of Mechanics and Edifications, and after Electrotechnics, Electronics, Telecommunications, Data Processing and Industrial Informatics.

In 1987 the School opened its second campus, located in the city of Cubatão, São Paulo state coast, and, in 1996, its third campus, located in Sertãozinho, in the interior of the state.

In this period, there was a high public acceptance of ETEFSP driven by its excellence in professional preparation of its students. The institution became respected and appreciated by the professional market.

In the year 2000, ETEFSP was transformed into Centro Federal de Educação Tecnológica (CEFET) (São Paulo Federal Center of Technological Education), there was a remodel and expansion of the institution's offerings related to education. More career options, campus and structural and technological improvements.

In 2005 was created the Campus of Guarulhos, 2006 Campus Caraguatatuba and Campus São João da Boa Vista, 2007 Campus Salto and Campus Bragança Paulista and in 2008 Campus São Carlos and Campus São Roque. Another campi was created at many cities, and there is expectation for more expansion in future.

In the year 2008 CEFET became the Instituto Federal de Educação, Ciência e Tecnologia de São Paulo (São Paulo Federal Institute of Education, Science and Technology). Today, the institute has more than 7.000 students. IFSP offers the following levels of education currently:

Undergraduate courses - Bachelor's degrees, Technological High Education and Teachers Formation Courses
Vocational and Technical education
Basic education - High School

IFSP has the objective of forming ethical citizens and professionals and of being an institution involved with the society. Its actions point toward the development of new technologies, cultural and social investments and the formation of critical citizens. The students abilities are improved and testes through the courses, helping them to develop the "know-how", and values concerning to all the areas.

Graduate education

Master's degree

Campus São Paulo 
Automation and Process Control
Sciences and Mathematics Teaching
Mechanical Engineering

Campus Sertãozinho 
Professional and Technological Education

The first and second degrees are called Mestrado Profissionalizante (Vocational master's degree, in free translation), and are master's degree focusing direct application and work on research environment.

Specialization degree

Campus Guarulhos 
Information Systems Management

Campus Matão 
Alcohol and Sugar: From Raw Material to Production and Quality Analysis

Campus São Paulo 
Young and Adult People Education
Professor Formation

In Brazil, a Specialization (Especialização, in Portuguese) is a graduate degree that can be attended before a master's degree. The People who have a Specialization degree don't receive a title as people who attended Master's and PhD's degree.

Undergraduate Education

Bachelor's degrees

Campus Piracicaba 
Mechanical Engineering

Campus São João da Boa Vista 
Control Engineering

Campus São Paulo 
Architecture
Civil Engineering
Control Engineering
Production Engineering

Campus São Roque 
Management

Campus Sertãozinho 
Mechanical Engineering
Electrical Engineering

Campus Votuporanga 
Civil Engineering
Control Engineering

Technology's degrees 
 Industrial Automation
 Electronic Systems
 Planning and Management in Construction
 Production and Machining Processes
 Information Systems
 Tourism
 Electrical-Powered Systems
 Industrial Electronics
 Industrial Mechatronics
 System Analysis and Development

Teachers formation undergraduate courses 
 Physics
 Geography
 Mathematics
 Chemistry
 Biological Sciences
 Natural Sciences
 Portuguese
 Portuguese and English
In the future:
 History
 Arts
 Philosophy
 Social Sciences

Technical and Vocational Education

Industrial 
Electronics
Automation
Electrotechnics
Maintenance of Electronic Equipment - Electronics
Planning and Production Control - Mechanics
Mechanics

IT and Telecommunications 
Operation of Computing Systems
Programming and Systems Development

Offer in Undergraduation

Basic Education 
Highschool

Campuses Locations 
Araraquara
Avaré
Barretos
Birigui
Boituva
Bragança Paulista
Campinas
Campos do Jordão
Capivari
Caraguatatuba
Catanduva
Cubatão
Guarulhos
Hortolândia
Ilha Solteira
Itapetininga
Itaquaquecetuba
Jacareí
Jundiaí
Matão
Piracicaba
São Paulo Pirituba
Presidente Epitácio
Registro
Salto
São Carlos
São João da Boa Vista
São José dos Campos
São Paulo
São Roque
Sorocaba
Sertãozinho
Suzano
Tupã
Votuporanga

See also

 Federal University of São Paulo
 São Paulo State Technological College
 Universities and Higher Education in Brazil

References

External links
 IFSP webpage

Federal Institutes of Education, Science and Technology in Brazil
Universities and colleges in São Paulo (state)
Educational institutions established in 1909
1909 establishments in Brazil
Universities and colleges in São Paulo